The 1919 Colorado College Tigers football team represented Colorado College during the 1919 college football season. The team was led by head coach Poss Parsons.

Schedule

References

Colorado College
Colorado College Tigers football seasons
Rocky Mountain Athletic Conference football champion seasons
Colorado College Tigers football